Stephanopachys substriatus, the powder-post beetle, is a species of horned powder-post beetle in the family Bostrichidae. It is found in Europe and Northern Asia (excluding China) and North America.

References

Further reading

External links

 

Bostrichidae
Articles created by Qbugbot
Beetles described in 1800